Mawr is a community in south Wales. 

Mawr means big or great in Welsh and may also refer to the following Wales-related topics:

Villages, hamlets, communities, etc.
Capel Mawr, Llangristiolus
Cefn Mawr
Cynnull-mawr
Merthyr Mawr

Lakes or polders
Marchlyn Mawr
Traeth Mawr

Mountains, summits, hills, geologic formations
Aber Mawr Shale
Bera Mawr
Bwlch Mawr
Castell Mawr Rock
Crug Mawr
Battle of Crug Mawr
Manod Mawr
Manod Mawr North Top
Moelwyn Mawr
Pegwn Mawr
Pen Allt-mawr
Pen Twyn Mawr

Nature reserves and Sites of Special Scientific Interest
Caeau Blaenau-mawr
Caeau Bronydd-mawr
Caeau Tir-mawr
Caeau Ty-mawr
Clegir Mawr
Coed Mawr – Blaen-Car
Crest Mawr Wood
Cwm Caner Mawr
Cytir Mawr
Merthyr Mawr Sand Dunes
Ogof Ffynnon Ddu-Pant Mawr
Pysgodlyn Mawr, a Site of Special Scientific Interest in Vale of Glamorgan

Varia
Mawr (surname)
Bryn Mawr (disambiguation)
Mynydd Mawr (disambiguation)
Tŷ Mawr (disambiguation)